"Porifericola rhodea" is a Gram-negative, strictly aerobic, rod-shaped and non-motile bacterium from a genus "Porifericola" which has been isolated from a marine sponge.

References

Sphingobacteriia
Bacteria described in 2011